So I Married an Anti-fan may refer to:
 So I Married an Anti-fan (novel), a South Korean novel by Kim Eun-jung
 So I Married an Anti-fan (TV series), an upcoming South Korean television series, based on the novel
 So I Married an Anti-fan (film), a Chinese film, based on the novel